Stigmatophora strigivenata is a moth in the subfamily Arctiinae. It was described by George Hampson in 1894. It is found in Myanmar.

References

Moths described in 1894
Lithosiini
Moths of Asia